Komang Teguh Trisnanda Putra (born 28 April 2002) is an Indonesian professional footballer who plays as a defender or defensive midfielder for Liga 1 club Borneo and the Indonesia national under-23 team.

Club career

Borneo
On 22 October 2020, he signed a contract with Borneo to play in Liga 1 in the 2020 season. Komang made his professional debut on 4 September 2021 in a match against Persita Tangerang at the Pakansari Stadium, Cibinong.

International career
Komang debuted in an Indonesia U16 when he was starting against Philippines U16 in the 2018 AFF U-16 Youth Championship and scoring his first U16 international goal in an 8–0 win against The Azkals.

In August 2019, Komang was called up to the Indonesia U-19 for the 2019 AFF U-18 Youth Championship by Fakhri Husaini and brought the U19 team to third place in the championship.

In October 2021, Komang was called up to the Indonesia U23 in a friendly match against Tajikistan and Nepal and also prepared for 2022 AFC U-23 Asian Cup qualification in Tajikistan by Shin Tae-yong.

Career statistics

Club

Notes

Honours

International
Indonesia U-16
 JENESYS Japan-ASEAN U-16 Youth Football Tournament: 2017
 AFF U-16 Youth Championship: 2018
Indonesia U-19
 AFF U-19 Youth Championship third place: 2019

References

External links
 Komang Teguh Trisnanda at Soccerway
 Komang Teguh Trisnanda at Liga Indonesia

2002 births
Living people
Indonesian footballers
Liga 1 (Indonesia) players
Borneo F.C. players
Association football defenders
People from Bangli Regency
Sportspeople from Bali
Indonesia youth international footballers